PowerDsine was a semiconductor and systems company, acquired by Microsemi in January 2007 following its IPO in 2004. It was established in 1994. Its initial products were Ringing (telephony) generators, and it also developed xDSL Remote Power Feeding Modules, before inventing Power over Ethernet's (PoE) precursor Power over LAN.

PowerDsine supplied PoE Injectors, PoE Test Equipment and PoE ICs.

References

External links
Official Website

Networking hardware companies
Telecommunications equipment vendors
Electronics companies established in 1994
Technology companies established in 1994
Israeli companies established in 1994
Companies formerly listed on the Nasdaq
Israeli brands
Electronics companies of Israel
Fabless semiconductor companies